The British Home Amateur Championship or British Amateur Championship was an annual football competition contested between the United Kingdom's four amateur national teams: England, Scotland, Wales and Northern Ireland (the last of whom competed as Ireland for the first three tournaments).  Starting during the 1953–54 season, it was contested until the 1973–74 season, after which the Football Association abolished the amateur distinction. From 1929 to 1953, an unofficial winner was declared by the press; during this time, Ireland and Wales did not meet regularly.

List of winners

Total wins

See also
 British Home Championship
 Four Nations Tournament

Notes

References

Defunct football competitions in the United Kingdom
Defunct international association football competitions in Europe
International association football competitions hosted by England
International association football competitions hosted by Northern Ireland
International association football competitions hosted by Scotland
International association football competitions hosted by Wales
Recurring sporting events established in 1953
Recurring sporting events disestablished in 1974
Annual sporting events in the United Kingdom
England–Scotland football rivalry
National championships in the United Kingdom
Amateur sport in the United Kingdom